Maud McClure Kelly (July 10, 1887 – April 2, 1973) was an American lawyer, suffragist and historian. She was the first woman to practice law in the state of Alabama and worked for the Alabama Department of Archives and History after her retirement from law.

Biography
Maud McClure Kelly was born in 1887 in Oxford, Alabama, to Richard Bussey Kelly and Leona Bledsoe Kelly. Her father was a lawyer and both of her parents were strong supporters of the Democratic Party and the Confederacy. She graduated from the Noble Institute, a girls' school in Anniston, Alabama, in 1904, and moved with her family to Birmingham in 1905. In Birmingham, she began working as a stenographer in her father's office and, realizing her own interest in the legal profession, started to study law. She wrote the entrance exam for the University of Alabama School of Law in 1907 and was admitted as the school's second-ever female student. She graduated a year later as the third in her class and was admitted to the Alabama bar in October 1908, making her the first woman to practice law in the state.

Kelly established a practice in Birmingham in 1908 and worked on both civil and criminal cases. In 1914, having been nominated by William Jennings Bryan, she became the first Southern woman admitted to the bar of the Supreme Court of the United States. She relocated to Washington, D.C., in 1919 to work as a federal attorney for the Department of the Interior, and returned to her practice in Birmingham in 1924. She closed the practice and ended her legal work in 1931.

Kelly was also involved in the women's suffrage movement, serving as chairman on the legislative committees of both the Birmingham and Alabama Equal Suffrage Associations. She was a devoted Baptist and member of the Democratic Party; she worked for Democrat Al Smith's presidential campaign in 1928 and hosted the Alabama delegation of the 1932 Democratic National Convention. After retiring from law, she worked as an archivist and historian. She was hired by the Alabama Department of Archives and History in 1943 as an acquisitions agent, inspector of county records, and editor of the Alabama Historical Quarterly journal. She retired in 1956 and worked in genealogy until her death in 1973.

Legacy
Kelly was inducted into the Alabama Women's Hall of Fame in 1990 and the Alabama Lawyers' Hall of Fame in 2014. An award given by the Alabama State Bar to influential women attorneys is named in Kelly's honor.

See also
List of first women lawyers and judges in Alabama

References

1887 births
1973 deaths
20th-century American historians
20th-century American lawyers
20th-century American women writers
20th-century Baptists
Activists from Alabama
Alabama Democrats
Alabama lawyers
American genealogists
American suffragists
American women historians
Baptists from Alabama
People from Oxford, Alabama
University of Alabama School of Law alumni
Writers from Alabama
20th-century American women lawyers